Wahed Nazari (born in Kabul, February 25, 1953) is an Afghan film director. He obtained a PHD as a director and in 1990 directed the noted Afghan film Arman which was based on 1978.

Films include Arman, De lmar pa Loor, Afghanistan bedone shorawiha, and Da konde zoi.

He presently is the director of Radio Television Afghanistan (RTA).

References

Afghan film directors
Pashtun people
Living people
People from Kabul
1953 births